Ángel César Mendoza Arámburo (15 December 1934 – 25 March 2014) was a Mexican politician, the first elected governor in the state of Baja California Sur for the period 1975 to 1981. As a lawyer for the National Autonomous University of Mexico, he held various positions within the Institutional Revolutionary Party. He was federal deputy in the legislature XLVII Congress and was Secretary for Tax Inspectorate of Ministry of Finance and Public Credit (1982). Acting as governor, founded in 1976, the Autonomous University of Baja California Sur. He was married to Luz Garayzar with whom he had three children: Guadalupe, Carlos and Cesar Angel.

Biography
He was born in La Paz (Baja California Sur) on December 15, 1934, the son of Angel Mendoza Sabido and Julia Arámburo. He attended elementary and high school in La Paz, BCS 1951 to 1952 he attended the high schools in the National Preparatory School in 1953, he enrolled at the Faculty of Law at the National Autonomous University of Mexico, where he graduated in 1957. He graduated in 1963 with a thesis on "Reforms Needed to Land Code in force."

References

Sources
 Historical, political, and  constitutional of Baja California Sur in Virtual law library (See October 2, 2009)
 General History of Baja California Sur (Spanish) in Google Books (See October 12, 2009)
 Google Books Mexican Political Biographies (See October 14, 2009)

1934 births
2014 deaths
Governors of Baja California Sur
Members of the Chamber of Deputies (Mexico)
Institutional Revolutionary Party politicians
National Autonomous University of Mexico alumni
People from La Paz, Baja California Sur
20th-century Mexican politicians
20th-century Mexican lawyers
Politicians from Baja California Sur